Avocettina paucipora is an eel in the family Nemichthyidae (snipe eels). It was described by Jørgen G. Nielsen and David G. Smith in 1978. It is a marine, temperate water-dwelling eel which is known from the southwestern Atlantic, southern Indian, and the Pacific Ocean. Male can reach a maximum total length of 55 centimetres.

A. paucipora is of no commercial interest to fisheries.

References

Nemichthyidae
Taxa named by Jørgen G. Nielsen
Taxa named by David G. Smith
Fish described in 1978